Ulrik Lindgren (born 1955) is a Swedish Christian democratic politician, member of the Riksdag 2002–2006.

References

Members of the Riksdag from the Christian Democrats (Sweden)
Living people
1955 births
Members of the Riksdag 2002–2006
Place of birth missing (living people)
Date of birth missing (living people)